Peter Gojowczyk was the defending champion but chose not to defend his title.

Hiroki Moriya won the title after defeating Chung Hyeon 4–6, 6–1, 6–4 in the final.

Seeds

Draw

Finals

Top half

Bottom half

References
Main Draw
Qualifying Draw

ATP Challenger China International - Nanchang - Singles